Dafydd Jenkins may refer to:
 Dafydd Jenkins (legal scholar)
 Dafydd Jenkins (rugby union)